The Arrell Global Food Innovation Award is an international award recognizing the achievements of individuals who have advanced food security around the world through contributions to science or communities. Conceived by the Arrell Family Foundation and established in 2018 with the creation of the Arrell Food Institute at the University of Guelph, two prizes are awarded each year: the first recognizes a researcher, or group of researchers, who has advanced understanding of food production, processing, distribution, consumption, safety and/or human nutrition, with a significant positive impact on society; the second recognizes an individual, or group of individuals, who has contributed to improved nutritional health and/or food security, with a focus on strengthening disadvantaged communities.

Winners receive $100,000 CAD and recognition at the annual Arrell Food Summit.

Laureates

Adjudicators 
Nadia Theodore, Senior Vice President, Maple Leaf Foods
Lawrence Hadad, executive director, Global Alliance for Improved Nutrition
Florence Lasbenes, managing director, 4SD
Adrienne Xavier, acting director, Indigenous Studies, McMaster University

Community Food Heroes 
In recognition of outstanding and innovative contributions to making their own communities’ food systems more equitable, nutritious, sustainable and just, the Adjudication Committee for the Arrell Global Food Innovation Awards has also periodically recognized “food heroes.”
2019
Northern Manitoba Food, Culture, and Community Collaborative
Lenore Newman, University of the Fraser Valley
Chef Elijah Amoo Addo, Food for All Africa
Hiwot Amare Getaneh, Nutrition for Education and Development
2018
Loaves and Fishes, Nanaimo, British Columbia
Our Sustenance
Black Creek Community Farm

References 

2018 establishments
Economic development awards